Serxwebûn is a journal and official organ of the Kurdistan Workers' Party (PKK). It was established in 1979 is currently printed in the Netherlands and published monthly. It publishes the speeches and views of the political leadership of the PKK but also keeps extensive records of the fallen fighters of the People's Defence Forces (HPG), the armed wing of the PKK. Its first editor in chief was Mazlum Doğan. It is often cited by scholars of the conflict between Turkey and the PKK.

References 

Turkish-language newspapers
1979 establishments in Turkey